Villa Vodno is the official workplace of the President of the Republic of North Macedonia. The villa is located in the foothills of Vodno at the southern edge of Skopje. Stevo Pendarovski, the current president, resides here.

In the villa, there are located: the office of the president, working premises of his service and premises for meetings and receptions. The walls in rooms for meetings and receptions are decorated with paintings of famous Macedonian artists. The villa has been visited by many state delegations including: Hamad bin Khalifa Al Thani, Bronisław Komorowski, Viktor Orbán, Ivo Josipović, Filip Vujanović, Valdis Zatlers, Stjepan Mesić, Roman Herzog, Zhelyu Zhelev, Bamir Topi, Tony Blair, Edi Rama, Borut Pahor, Václav Klaus, Kiro Gligorov.

External links
 Virtual Tour of Villa Vodno on the official website of the President of the Republic of North Macedonia

Buildings and structures in Skopje
Official residences in North Macedonia
Presidential residences